Jurij A. Treguboff (1913–2000) was a Soviet writer.

1913 births
2000 deaths
Soviet writers
Date of birth missing